Brookhart is a surname. Notable people with the surname include:

 J. D. Brookhart (born 1964), American football player and coach
 Maurice Brookhart (born 1942), American chemist
 Smith W. Brookhart (1869–1944), American politician